The Tree is a 1993 short film that Todd Field created while a fellow at the AFI Conservatory. It is a non-verbal dramatic piece following the life of a boy born at the turn of the century. The single setting, an apple tree set high on a rural ridge, is where we glimpse the boy mature, fall in love, go to war, return with his own son, and finally pay his last respects as a very old man who has seen much change. The set was designed using the tree as a scale foreground visual anchor and employing forced perspective for other items appearing in frame, including distant mountains, a train, and a town in transition. The scene changes from season to season and year to year all achieved practically using trompe-l'œil.

The film is loosely based upon and inspired by the story The Giving Tree by Shel Silverstein.

External links

1993 films
1993 short films
Films about trees
Films directed by Todd Field
American short films
1990s English-language films